Trailblazer is a family roller coaster at Hersheypark in Hershey, Pennsylvania. It is located in the Pioneer Frontier section of Hersheypark, just below Storm Runner. The ride is notable for being the second-oldest operating coaster in the park, after the Comet.

History
According to a 1974 Souvenir book printed before the coaster was finalized, the ride was supposed to feature two lifts.

The ride received two brand new trains in 2003 built by Premier Rides. The main difference is the new cars had individual lap bars for each seat, rather than the single "t-bar" lap bars for each pair of seats.

Ride experience
The coaster reaches speeds of up to 35 mph, and features a helix that circles 4 times. The mid-course brake zone is nearly level with Storm Runner, and the queue for that ride extends inside Trailblazer's first drop.

References

External links

Hersheypark
Roller coasters introduced in 1974